Georges Corriveau (born July 17, 1951) is Canadian former politician. He served in the Legislative Assembly of New Brunswick from 1987 to 1995 as a Liberal member from the constituency of Madawaska les Lacs.

References

1951 births
Living people
Acadian people
New Brunswick Liberal Association MLAs
People from Edmundston